Camelot is a fantasy historical drama television series created by Michael Hirst and Chris Chibnall for Starz. An Irish-Canadian co-production, the series is based on the Arthurian legend, and stars an ensemble cast led by Joseph Fiennes, Jamie Campbell Bower, and Eva Green.

Camelot premiered on Starz in the United States on 25 February 2011, with a special full-length preview showing of the pilot episode. It then formally premiered on 1 April 2011, and concluded on 10 June 2011, after ten episodes. The series debuted to strong ratings and subsequently earned a Primetime Emmy Award for Outstanding Original Main Title Theme Music nomination. On 30 June 2011, Starz announced it was not going to order additional episodes of Camelot, citing scheduling conflicts with some members of the cast, including Fiennes, Campbell Bower and Green, as the main reason.

Plot
It is the late 5th century and Britain has been free of Roman rule for several decades. With King Uther's sudden death chaos threatens to engulf Britain. The sorcerer Merlin has visions of a dark future and installs the young and impetuous Arthur, Uther's unknown son and heir who has been raised as a commoner, as the new king. Merlin and Arthur install themselves in Castle Camelot with their allies, which include Arthur's biological mother Igraine, his foster brother Kay and loyal warriors Leontes, Gawain, Ulfius and Brastias. From Camelot, Arthur tries to build a new and better Britain, where people can live in peace.

Meanwhile, Arthur's cold and ambitious half-sister, Morgan plots to take the crown from him. Banished by her father, King Uther, who was responsible for her mother's murder to put Arthur's mother on the throne, Morgan is responsible for Uther's death and wants to rule as his successor. Aided by her loyal maid, Vivian and the devious nun, Sybil, Morgan takes up residence in Uther's old castle, Castle Pendragon, from where she schemes against Arthur.

Cast and characters

Main
 Joseph Fiennes as Merlin – the creator and custodian of the legend of Camelot. As Arthur's greatest and most powerful ally, Merlin believes in him even more than Arthur believes in himself. He can foresee the threats to Arthur more clearly than anyone, but he must fight the dark nature of his power and harness it to bring forth a new Camelot.
 Jamie Campbell Bower as King Arthur – a handsome, carefree young man. He is torn from his home and family upon learning he is the only male heir to the throne as a result of the king's untimely death. Arthur's intense education in a dark, unruly world inspires him to pursue a kingdom based on justice, hope, and freedom from tyranny while the lands he oversees are corrupted by violence, greed, and despair.
 Eva Green as Morgan Pendragon – the beautiful and ruthlessly ambitious daughter of King Uther. She wishes to claim her right to her father's throne, but she does not count on Merlin's plans or the existence of Arthur, her newly revealed half-brother. In her pursuit of power and revenge, Morgan gives herself over to dark forces that allow her to threaten the court of Camelot from within. She functions as the main antagonist of the series.
 Tamsin Egerton as Guinevere – an ambitious and strong willed woman, making her a source of great support and strength to Arthur as he grows into his role as king. Although she is married to Leontes, one of Arthur's most loyal knights, she cannot deny the attraction she and Arthur feel for each other.
 Claire Forlani as Igraine – Arthur's biological mother and second wife of King Uther.  She is estranged from her son and despised by her step-daughter Morgan. She has lived a life of deep pain and agony, but has never lost her faith or her heart. Igraine quickly becomes an ally and figure of strength for Arthur and the entire court of Camelot.
 Chipo Chung as Vivian – a young woman who is descended from a people brought to Britain as slaves. She served as an indentured servant at Uther's court and now works as an attendant and messenger for Morgan.
 Sinéad Cusack as Sybil – a nun who has raised Morgan and comes to live with her. She is a motherly figure for Morgan, acting as her advisor in matters both political and supernatural. She takes the blame for Morgan's treason, and is beheaded by Gawain.
 Peter Mooney as Kay – Arthur's fiercely loyal older brother. Kay encourages Arthur to take up his destiny as King of Britain. As the king's Marshal, Kay has the freedom to become his own man, but will always remain Arthur's older brother and closest friend.
 Clive Standen as Gawain – a former knight and great warrior. He has become disillusioned and lost his way in life. Kay and Leontes recruit him to join the court of Camelot. He eventually comes to Camelot and realizes Arthur is different and not just another warlord. Inspired, he finds reason to fight and train Arthur's men.
 Philip Winchester as Leontes – one of King Uther's bravest knights. Leontes pledges his loyalty to the new king after Uther's death and joins Arthur in Camelot. Married to Guinevere, his loyalty and experience are invaluable to the young king as he attempts to secure order in a land beset by violence and threats from rivals to the throne.

Recurring
 Sebastian Koch as King Uther, Arthur's biological father who was poisoned and killed by Morgan.
 James Purefoy as King Lot, a warrior-king who forms an alliance with Morgan.
 Diarmaid Murtagh as Brastias, a knight of King Arthur.
 Jamie Downey as Ulfius, a knight of King Arthur, who is killed during the battle at Bardon Pass.
 Daragh O'Malley as Leodegrance, Guinevere's father.
 Sean Pertwee as Sir Ector, Arthur's foster father and Kay's father.
 Lara Jean Chorostecki as Bridget, Guinevere's cousin.

Episodes 

Notes

Production
In October 2010, Camelot was the first series to get the green light from Starz since Chris Albrecht took over as president and CEO of the company. With the announcement of plans for the series, Albrecht said that "The story of Arthur isn't history, it's mythology, and Camelot isn't a place but an idea of hope that has resonated at different times throughout history." The series was also the first project for GK-TV, a television division of GK Films (headed by Academy Award-winning producer Graham King and producer Timothy Headington) launched in January 2010. King called the series "a perfect choice as GK-TV's maiden project," given the company's mandate for "producing compelling cinematic quality programming for television." The series idea is attributed to the U.K.'s Ecosse Films, and an "early incarnation" was set up at Showtime in 2008, with that network announcing plans for the series in conjunction with BBC.

Chris Chibnall, known for writing episodes for Life on Mars (2006-2007) and Torchwood (2006-2008), and former showrunner of Law & Order: UK (2009), was selected to become the showrunner and head writer on the show. Chibnall was no newcomer to the legend of Camelot, having previously been in charge of developing a series about Merlin in 2005 for BBC. However, despite several scripts being written, BBC Head of Drama Jane Tranter eventually decided not to green-light the project, although it later emerged, without Chibnall's involvement, as Merlin (2008–2012).

Chibnall stated that every era needs its own version of the story of Camelot and that this version would include strong currents of politics and romance in an adult drama: "The amazing thing about Camelot is you can talk about political pursuits and it's all about the romance. It's all about the passion. It's all about great ideals compromised by falling in love with the wrong person." Chibnall also stated that the story had a special relevance for today's world because it dealt with the promise of world leaders to create a better world, and then trying to carry through on their promises.

The series was engineered by executive producers Morgan O'Sullivan of Octagon in Ireland and John Weber of Take 5 Productions in Canada. O'Sullivan had experience with the story through his involvement with the 2004 film King Arthur.
Other executive producers included Graham King and Timothy Headington of GK Films, Craig Cegielski of GK-TV, James Flynn of Octagon, Douglas Rae of UK's Ecosse Films, Fred Fuchs, Michael Hirst and Anne Thomopoulos.

The cast assembled at Ardmore Studios in Ireland in June–July 2010 to begin principal photography for the series, which was created as an Irish-Canadian international co-production.  After the Ireland filming, post-production and visual effects took place in Toronto, Ontario, Canada. The cost was estimated at $7 million per episode. Starz retained U.S. rights, including digital and home entertainment distribution, Take 5 Productions owned distribution rights in Canada, and GK-TV for the rest of the world. The series aired on Channel 4 in the UK, RTÉ in Ireland, CBC in Canada, Nine Network in Australia, RTL in The Netherlands, and VIER in Belgium.

The series used well-known stories and legends about King Arthur, including Le Morte d'Arthur "but those only provided a starting point". The goal of the producers was to create episodes that "weave historical authenticity into a telling of the Arthur legends that is relatable to contemporary audiences". The relationship between Merlin (Joseph Fiennes) and Arthur (Jamie Campbell Bower) was central to the show. Fiennes has joked that he thinks "of Merlin as a sort of cross between Obi-Wan Kenobi and Donald Rumsfeld," referring to Kenobi's mentoring qualities and Rumsfeld's political agendas. Fiennes described Merlin as a "...sort of tutor. He's a father figure. He's a brutal headmaster. He's got to give this boy all of the tools to be king in a ruthless world, and he has to do it in a very short space of time. So there's a lot of 'cruel to be kind.

While the first season was limited to ten episodes, the producers indicated that if the response to the show were strong, they had plans for "several additional seasons". It was announced on 30 June 2011, that Camelot would not be returning for a second season and US network Starz had ruled out production for 2011.

Promotion

Publicity releases noted the series would consist of ten episodes that would "redefine the classic medieval tale of King Arthur." Advance descriptions of the series described it as having "sex, sword-fighting, magic, comedy". According to a tongue-in-cheek comment by Joseph Fiennes, it should be watched for another reason: "Because it's not a musical [in reference to the musical Camelot, its 873 performances, and its subsequent productions]."

Starz invested in a number of initiatives to promote the series, including the advance airing of the first episode (scheduled for normal broadcast on 1 April 2011) on 25 February 2011, following the series finale of that network's successful series, Spartacus: Gods of the Arena. That episode, "Homecoming", was subsequently posted on the special series website created by Starz, where it could be streamed for home viewing.

In addition to a meeting with film critics to talk about the show, individual interviews with the writer and a number of cast members have been conducted, a Facebook page has been created, and many of the stars have been blogging and tweeting about the show's progress during and after the filming.  Additionally, special short video trailers and behind-the-scenes video teasers were also posted online. The upcoming series was also advertised online in a "Starz Originals" video, promoting both current and future original series.

Starz also released a poster showing Arthur and Morgan and a series of promotional photos. In addition to the official promotions, fans created a website to include news and images of the upcoming series.

Reception
Advance publicity for the series was positive, as evidenced by the comments of Maureen Ryan, who writes the "Stay Tuned" column for TVSquad.com. Other critics were also comparing the series to the upcoming HBO series, Game of Thrones. Critic James Hibberd refers to both shows as "swords 'n' sorcery epics", with a "quest for the kingship as the central storyline" – but adds the comment that there is no reason to choose one over the other, implying that viewers might be able to enjoy both. Hibberd adds the one-word description, "fleshy", to describe the new Starz show. One website used the phrase, "Starz makes Camelot sexy again." A critic for the Daily Inquirer wrote, "I watched the sneak preview and it looks like Starz has another hit on their hands", and The New York Times called the series "An Arthur worthy of the modern ages." On the KFOG morning show Tim Goodman, The Hollywood Reporter'''s Chief Television Critic, called Camelot "a lightweight version of Game of Thrones" and "almost more like a guilty pleasure".Camelot received a score of 58 on Metacritic. Negative reviews included Time magazine saying, "Even on the level of it's-just-entertainment, Camelot is exceedingly silly", and the Pittsburgh Post-Gazette saying, "it's a lot less graphic than Starz's ultra-sexy, ultra-violent Spartacus franchise. Dramatically, Camelot'' also pales in comparison. It's dull and talky and its first three episodes offer few surprises in storytelling."

The two-hour premiere was the highest-rated and most-watched premiere for an original series on Starz at that time. The series was nominated for a Primetime Emmy Award, a Saturn Award and additional award nominations internationally.

See also
List of works based on Arthurian legends

References

External links

Television series based on Arthurian legend
2011 Canadian television series debuts
2011 Irish television series debuts
2011 Canadian television series endings
2011 Irish television series endings
2011 British television series debuts
2011 British television series endings
2011 American television series debuts
2011 American television series endings
English-language television shows
Starz original programming
Channel 4 original programming
CBC Television original programming
RTÉ original programming
Television shows set in England
2010s Canadian drama television series
2010s British drama television series
Irish action television series
Canadian action television series
British action television series
Television about magic
Witchcraft in television
Wizards in television
Television series set in the 5th century
American action television series
American adventure television series
American fantasy television series
Canadian fantasy television series
Canadian adventure television series
British fantasy television series
Irish fantasy television series
American fantasy drama television series
Works set in castles